Donja Motičina is a municipality in Osijek-Baranja County, Croatia. There are 1,652 inhabitants (2011 census).

References

Municipalities of Osijek-Baranja County